Albert E. Moll was a Canadian psychiatrist who pioneered the day treatment of psychiatric patients.

Dr. Moll was educated at McGill University, earning a degree in law before studying medicine. He became the Chief Psychiatrist at the Allan Memorial Institute and Chief of Staff at the Montreal General Hospital, establishing the first inpatient psychiatric unit there. Moll lectured at McGill where he was considered one of the leading academic psychiatrists at the time.

Besides his work in day treatment options in the treatment of psychiatric patients he also espoused a night treatment option.

Personal life
Dr. Moll was married to a nurse, Patricia Mary Anthony Moll (née Moore). They had twin daughters Joan and Jill.

Notes

Canadian psychiatrists
McGill University Faculty of Law alumni
Year of birth missing
Year of death missing
Physicians of Montreal General Hospital